Louis Segond (3 May 1810 – 18 June 1885) was a Swiss theologian who translated the Bible into French from the original texts in Hebrew and Greek.

He was born in Plainpalais, near Geneva. After studying theology in Geneva, Strasbourg and Bonn, he was pastor of the Geneva National Church in Chêne-Bougeries, then from 1872, Professor of Old Testament in Geneva.

The translation of the Old Testament, commissioned by the Vénérable Compagnie des Pasteurs de Genève, was published in two volumes in 1871 (Meusel has 1874 as the publication date), followed by the New Testament, translated as a private venture, in 1880. The text was then reviewed by experts.

A revised edition was commissioned for and published by the British and Foreign Bible Society in 1910.

External links
 Unabridged book-by-book 1910 revision of Segond's translation of the Bible vargenau.free.fr
 Various options for downloading or searching www.awmach.org
  Free audiobook of Louis Segond's Version  at www.bibvoice.org
 Modern LSG bible app for Android  at www.bibvoice.org
  Modern LSG bible app for IOS  at www.bibvoice.org
 Bible Louis Segond Bible en français, lecture en ligne.
 
 

Translators of the Bible into French
Writers from Geneva
Swiss Protestant theologians
1810 births
1885 deaths
19th-century translators